Events from the year 1898 in Scotland.

Incumbents 

 Secretary for Scotland and Keeper of the Great Seal – Lord Balfour of Burleigh

Law officers 
 Lord Advocate – Andrew Murray
 Solicitor General for Scotland – Charles Dickson

Judiciary 
 Lord President of the Court of Session and Lord Justice General – Lord Robertson
 Lord Justice Clerk – Lord Kingsburgh

Events 
 22 January – the People's Palace on Glasgow Green opens.
 18 October – Trinity Chain Pier at Trinity, Edinburgh, collapses in a storm.
 1 November – completion throughout of the Highland Railway's Inverness and Aviemore Direct Railway.
 The Madelvic Motor Carriage Company opens its factory for the manufacture of electric vehicles in Granton, Edinburgh, one of the first purpose-built car factories in the U.K. The company goes into liquidation in December 1899.
 Charles Rennie Mackintosh carries out the interior design for Catherine Cranston's tearooms in Argyle Street, Glasgow, including the first appearance of his characteristic high-backed chair.
 Scottish-born American industrialist Andrew Carnegie purchases Skibo Castle in Sutherland (which he has been leasing for a year).
 Construction of Glenborrodale Castle on the Ardnamurchan peninsula as a guest residence for mining magnate Charles Rudd by architect Sydney Mitchell begins.
 United Collieries Ltd formed in Glasgow to acquire coal mining companies.
 The Church of Scotland introduces the Church Hymnary.

Births 
 13 February – Duncan Campbell, evangelical revivalist (died 1972)
 7 April – Dorothy Renton, gardener (died 1966)
 26 April – John Grierson, documentary film maker (died 1972 in England)
 28 April – William Soutar, poet (died 1943)
 18 July – John Stuart, actor (died 1979)
 31 July – Doris Zinkeisen, theatrical designer and commercial artist (died 1991 in England)
 11 September – John Meikle, winner of the Victoria Cross (killed 1918 on the Western Front (World War I))
 27 December – W. C. Sellar, humourist (died 1951 in England)
 William Gillies, painter (died 1973)

Deaths 
 21 July – William Alexander Hunter, academic lawyer and Liberal politician (born 1844)
 16 October – John Ritchie Findlay, newspaper owner and philanthropist (born 1824)
 7 November – Màiri Mhòr nan Òran, Gaelic poet (born 1821)
 10 December – William Black, novelist (born 1841)

See also 
 Timeline of Scottish history
 1898 in the United Kingdom

References 

 
Years of the 19th century in Scotland
Scotland
1890s in Scotland